The robust cardinalfish (Epigonus robustus) is a species of deepwater cardinalfish found around the world in southern temperate waters at depths of from .  It can reach a length of  TL.

It is a vigorous fish which, apart from the second dorsal fin exhibiting a longer spine, resembles the big-eyed cardinalfish.

References
 Tony Ayling & Geoffrey Cox, Collins Guide to the Sea Fishes of New Zealand,  (William Collins Publishers Ltd, Auckland, New Zealand 1982) 

Epigonidae
Fish described in 1927
Taxa named by Keppel Harcourt Barnard